Rene Röthke (born July 27, 1982) is a German professional ice hockey player who currently plays for Deggendorfer SC in the DEL2. On February 10, 2016, he agreed to return for his 8th season with the Straubing Tigers for the 2016–17 campaign.

References

External links

1982 births
Living people
Augsburger Panther players
Berlin Capitals players
Deggendorfer SC players
Eisbären Berlin players
ERC Ingolstadt players
ETC Crimmitschau players
Fischtown Pinguins players
Hamburg Freezers players
Hannover Scorpions players
German ice hockey right wingers
Straubing Tigers players